Exorcising Ghosts is a compilation album by the British band Japan, released in November 1984 by record label Virgin.

Content 

Exorcising Ghosts was compiled and produced in consultation with lead singer David Sylvian two years after Japan dissolved. It features three recordings from the band's early career on the Hansa Records label (such as 1979's Quiet Life) but mainly focuses on material from their two studio albums on Virgin Records; Gentlemen Take Polaroids (1980) and Tin Drum (1981).

Besides top 40 hit singles like "Quiet Life", "Visions of China", "Ghosts", and "Nightporter", the double-album set includes album tracks like "Methods of Dance", "Talking Drum" and "Swing" alongside a selection of rarities such as the single B-sides "A Foreign Place" and "Life Without Buildings", the 1981 remix of "Taking Islands in Africa", the instrumental studio recording "Voices Raised in Welcome, Hands Held in Prayer" included on 1983's live album Oil on Canvas and the 12" mix of "The Art of Parties".

As to fit the album onto a single disc, the original CD release omitted five of the sixteen tracks; "Swing", "A Foreign Place", "Taking Islands in Africa", "Sons of Pioneers" and "Voices Raised in Welcome, Hands Held in Prayer".

Release 

Exorcising Ghosts reached No. 45 in the UK Albums Chart and was certified Gold (100,000 copies) by the BPI in February 1997.

Seven years after the release of Exorcising Ghosts, Japan recorded a new studio album, but under the new moniker Rain Tree Crow.

Track listing

CD release (1984)

References

External links 

 
 Exorcising Ghosts at allmusic.com

Japan (band) albums
1984 compilation albums
Albums produced by John Punter
Virgin Records compilation albums
Albums with cover art by Russell Mills (artist)